Mehar Ishtiaq Ahmad (born 8 September 1957) is a Pakistani politician who had been a member of the National Assembly of Pakistan, from June 2013 to May 2018. Previously he had been a member of the Provincial Assembly of Punjab from 2002 to 2013.

Early life and education
He was born on 8 September 1957 in Lahore.

He earned the degree of Bachelor of Commerce in 1982 from University of the Punjab.

Political career

He ran for the seat of the National Assembly of Pakistan as an independent candidate from Constituency NA-121 (Lahore-IV) in 2002 Pakistani general election but was unsuccessful. He received 131 votes and lost the seat to Farid Ahmad Paracha, a candidate of Muttahida Majlis-e-Amal. In the same election, he was elected to the Provincial Assembly of Punjab as a candidate of Pakistan Muslim League (N) (PML-N) from Constituency PP-150 (Lahore-XIV). He received 18,197 votes and defeated Asghar Ali Gill, a candidate of Pakistan Muslim League (Q) (PML-Q).

He was re-elected to the Provincial Assembly of Punjab as a candidate of PML-N from Constituency PP-150 (Lahore-XIV) in 2008 Pakistani general election. He received 34,053 votes and defeated Asif Mahmood Nagira, a candidate of Pakistan Peoples Party (PPP).

He was elected to the National Assembly as a candidate of PML-N from Constituency NA-121 (Lahore-IV) in 2013 Pakistani general election. He received 114,474 votes and defeated Hammad Azhar, a candidate of Pakistan Tehreek-e-Insaf (PTI). In the same election, he was re-elected to the Provincial Assembly of Punjab as a candidate of PML-N from Constituency PP-150 (Lahore-XIV). He received 57,232 votes and defeated Mehar Wajid Azeem, a candidate of PTI. He retained National Assembly seat.

References

Living people
Pakistan Muslim League (N) politicians
Punjabi people
Pakistani MNAs 2013–2018
1957 births
Punjab MPAs 2002–2007
Punjab MPAs 2008–2013